Lauren Johnson (born May 4, 1987) is a middle-distance runner from the United States. She competed in the Women's 1500 metres event at the 2015 World Championships in Athletics in Beijing, China.

Professional
The former Oregon Track Club Elite athlete placed 4th at the 2015 USA Track & Field Championships, but she did not have an "A" standard qualifying time to punch her automatic ticket to the 2015 IAAF World Championships in Beijing.

Thus began her summer European circuit in hopes of dipping under the necessary 4:06.50 in the 1500m or 4:25.20 in the Mile.

On July 18 in Heusden-Zolder, Belgium at the 2015 KBC Night of Athletics meet, Johnson placed second, clocking 4:04.17 to secure her spot on Team USA.

Johnson won the 2016 Sir Walter Miler in a meet, outdoor North Carolina state and personal record of 4:25.04 (and her first sub-4:30 Mile), and six days later, at the third stop on the BBTM Grand Prix Tour 2016, she won the ServiceNow West Chester Mile, stopping the clock at 4:31.33.

Personal
Johnson went to college on athletic scholarships for both track and basketball. Her husband Nick was named the Head Coach at alma mater from 2018 to 2020 (Huntington University). She took over for Nick in February 2021 following charges of identity deception and child seduction relating to a relationship with a member of the team while he was coach.

Born and raised in Huntington, Indiana, she attended Huntington North High School prior to Huntington University, where she earned a degree in Exercise Science with a minor in Psychology.
 
At Huntington University, Johnson earned All-American honors in track, cross country, and basketball. On her multi-sport background, she said, "I started playing basketball when I was 4 years old and that was my main sport all the way through college. I only began to focus on running once I graduated, so I'm pretty new to the elite level of track and field."

Johnson was sidelined with injuries ahead of the 2012 Olympic Trials and 2013 USA Championships. In 2015, she qualified for the World Championships in Beijing, where she finished a semi-finalist, and had achieved the Olympic Standard for Rio in the 1500.

See also
 United States at the 2015 World Championships in Athletics

References

External links
 Lauren Johnson profile on Twitter
 BAA Lauren Johnson profile
 

American female middle-distance runners
Living people
People from Huntington, Indiana
Sportspeople from Indiana
1987 births
World Athletics Championships athletes for the United States
Huntington University (United States) alumni
American female cross country runners
21st-century American women
Track and field athletes from Indiana